News and Views may refer to:
News and Views (1948–1951), an early TV news program
News and Views, a talk radio program in Fargo, North Dakota
"News and Views", a slogan for HLN (TV channel)